Gour Mahavidyalaya (abbreviated as GM) is a college in Old Malda in the Malda district of West Bengal, India. The college is affiliated to the University of Gour Banga, offering undergraduate courses. It is the only college in Malda and nearby districts which offers a 3-year B.A. (Honours) degree in Mass Communication and Journalism. The college is located at Mangal Bari, a neighborhood of Old Malda, under UA city of Malda.

Accreditation 
Now the college is accredited Grade B+ (2nd Cycle) by NAAC. It is also recognized by the UGC.

Notable alumni 
 Sabina Yeasmin

See also

References

External links 
 
University of Gour Banga
University Grants Commission
National Assessment and Accreditation Council

Universities and colleges in Malda district
Colleges affiliated to University of Gour Banga
Academic institutions formerly affiliated with the University of North Bengal
Educational institutions established in 1985
1985 establishments in West Bengal